Verrucaria nigrescens is a widespread species of crustose lichen in the family Verrucariaceae. It was first formally described as a new species by Christiaan Hendrik Persoon in 1795. The lichen produces a very dark brown thallus that grows on rocks; the medulla is black. There are black perithecia that resemble buried dots, and which measure 0.15–0.3 mm in diameter. Ascospores measure 14–24 by 7–11 μm.

See also
 List of Verrucaria species

References

nigrescens
Lichen species
Lichens described in 1795
Lichens of Europe
Lichens of North America
Taxa named by Christiaan Hendrik Persoon